Somers Point is a city that is the oldest settlement in Atlantic County, in the U.S. state of New Jersey. It was settled by Europeans in 1693 and was incorporated as a borough in 1886. Somers Point was incorporated as a city in 1902. As of the 2020 United States census, the city's population was 10,469, a decrease of 326 (−3.0%) from the 2010 census count of 10,795, which in turn reflected a decline of 819 (−7.1%) from the 11,614 counted in the 2000 census.

Somers Point is in the eastern part of Atlantic County, southwest of Atlantic City.

History
The earliest settlers of the area were the Lenape Native Americans. John Somers was the first European settler in what is now Somers Point. Somers purchased the land along the northern periphery of the Great Egg Harbor Bay from Thomas Budd in 1693, making it the oldest European settlement in what is now Atlantic County. Great Egg Harbour Township was designated in 1693 from the eastern portions of Gloucester County, which included Somers Point. Somers named the area Somerset Plantation, Somers Ferry, and Somers Plantation, until the name Somers Point became established in 1750. In 1695, John Somers operated the first ferry service across the Great Egg Harbor Bay to Cape May County. His son Richard built Somers Mansion overlooking the harbor sometime between 1720 and 1726, which remains the county's oldest existing home. Somers Point was designated as a port of entry in 1791 and remained one until it was abolished in 1915. By the 1830s, when Somers Point became part of Atlantic County, it was a popular summer resort with several boarding houses.

Somers Point was incorporated as a borough by an act of the New Jersey Legislature on April 24, 1886, from portions of Egg Harbor Township, based on the results of a referendum held five days earlier. At that time, there were 48 people registered to vote in the borough. Somers Point was reincorporated as a borough on April 2, 1890, based on the previous day's referendum. Somers Point was incorporated as a city on April 9, 1902, from all of Somers Point borough and additional portions of Egg Harbor Township. The borough was named for John Somers.

Geography
According to the United States Census Bureau, the city had a total area of 5.23 square miles (13.55 km2), including 4.01 square miles (10.39 km2) of land and 1.22 square miles (3.17 km2) of water (23.37%).

Unincorporated communities, localities and place names located partially or completely within the township include Ocean Heights.

The city borders Egg Harbor Township, Longport and  Linwood in Atlantic County; and both Ocean City and Upper Township in Cape May County.

Demographics

2010 census

The Census Bureau's 2006–2010 American Community Survey showed that (in 2010 inflation-adjusted dollars) median household income was $47,312 (with a margin of error of +/− $4,646) and the median family income was $51,489 (+/− $7,704). Males had a median income of $45,385 (+/− $6,862) versus $37,536 (+/− $3,731) for females. The per capita income for the city was $29,626 (+/− $1,822). About 11.9% of families and 12.7% of the population were below the poverty line, including 25.6% of those under age 18 and 6.6% of those age 65 or over.

2000 census
At the 2000 United States census, there were 11,614 people, 4,920 households and 2,952 families residing in the city. The racial makeup of the city was 85.66% White, 7.01% African American, 0.25% Native American, 3.17% Asian, 0.03% Pacific Islander, 2.25% from other races, and 1.64% from two or more races. Hispanic or Latino of any race were 5.99% of the population.

There were 4,920 households, of which 29.4% had children under the age of 18 living with them, 41.2% were married couples living together, 14.5% had a female householder with no husband present, and 40.0% were non-families. 32.9% of all households were made up of individuals, and 11.7% had someone living alone who was 65 years of age or older. The average household size was 2.32 and the average family size was 2.97.

Age distribution was 23.4% under the age of 18, 7.1% from 18 to 24, 31.6% from 25 to 44, 22.9% from 45 to 64, and 15.1% who were 65 years of age or older. The median age was 38 years. For every 100 females, there were 88.7 males. For every 100 females age 18 and over, there were 84.2 males.

The median household income was $42,222, and the median family income was $51,868. Males had a median income of $39,650 versus $28,691 for females. The per capita income for the city was $22,229. About 5.0% of families and 7.0% of the population were below the poverty line, including 8.3% of those under age 18 and 2.3% of those age 65 or over.

Economy
The largest employer in Somers Point is Shore Medical Center, with 1,500 employees, 370 physicians, and 296 beds.

Somers Point is the home to the largest crabbing tournament in the United States, the Assault on Patcong Creek. Founded in 2010, the tournament takes place annually in June and attracts participants from over a dozen states.

Government

Local government
Somers Point is governed under the City form of government, as one of 15 municipalities (of the 564) statewide that use this traditional form of government. The governing body is comprised of the Mayor and the seven-member City Council, all elected on a partisan basis as part of the November general election. The mayor serves a four-year term, with a single council at-large seat and one council member from each of the two wards up for election each year in a three-year cycle. The Mayor is responsible for the health, safety and welfare of the municipality. As the city's Chief Executive Officer, the Mayor puts into effect the municipal laws, known as ordinances. The Mayor can veto ordinances and may vote in the event of a tie. The Mayor makes appointments to certain boards, including the Planning Board, Recreation Commission, and Environmental Commission. The Council elects one of its members as President to chair the Council meetings and perform the other duties of a presiding officer. The City Council enacts ordinances, adopts an annual budget and sets policy for the city.

, the Mayor of Somers Point is Republican John L. "Jack" Glasser Jr., whose term of office ends on December 31, 2023. Members of the City Council are Council President Janice Johnston (R, 2024; 1st Ward), Karen Bruno (D, 2023; 2nd Ward), Richard DePamphilis (R, 2023; 1st Ward - Appointed to serve an unexpired term), Howard W. Dill (R, 2024; 2nd Ward), Joseph T. McCarrie Jr. (R, 2024; At Large), Sean T. McGuigan (R, 2022; 1st Ward) and Michael Owen (R, 2022; 2nd Ward).

After Stacy Ferreri resigned in January 2022 from her seat expiring in December 2023, the City Council appointed Ken Adams, though Adams was forced to step down in February after it was discovered that he had a felony conviction that disqualified him from serving. In March 2022, Richard DePamphilis was appointed to fill the vacant seat.

In August 2019, the City Council selected Janice Johnston from a list of three candidates nominated by the Republican municipal committee to fill the First Ward seat expiring in December 2021 that had been held by Ron Meischker until he resigned the previous month after announcing that he was moving out of the city.

In September 2017, the City Council selected Ron Meischker from a list of three candidates nominated by the Republican Municipal Committee to fill the vacant 1st Ward seat expiring in December 2018 that had been held by Thomas Smith until he resigned from office earlier that month.

In January 2016, the City Council selected James Toto from three names nominated by the Republican municipal committee to fill the 2nd Ward seat expiring in 2017 that was vacated by Maureen Kern when she took office as a member of the Atlantic County Board of Chosen Freeholders. Toto served on an interim basis until the November 2016 general election, when he was elected to serve the balance of the term.

In elections held on November 8, 2011, Jack Glasser defeated Democrat-turned Independent Daniel Gudauskas by 1,650–558, making it the largest margin of victory in a contested election on the municipal level in Somers Point history. Triboletti and Kern ran unopposed in the first and second wards respectively.

Federal, state and county representation
Somers Point is located in the 2nd Congressional District and is part of New Jersey's 2nd state legislative district. Prior to the 2011 reapportionment following the 2010 Census, Somers Point had been in the 1st Legislative District.

 

Atlantic County is governed by a directly elected county executive and a nine-member Board of County Commissioners, responsible for legislation. The executive serves a four-year term and the commissioners are elected to staggered three-year terms, of which four are elected from the county on an at-large basis and five of the commissioners represent equally populated districts. , Atlantic County's Executive is Republican Dennis Levinson, whose term of office ends December 31, 2023. Members of the Board of County Commissioners are:

Ernest D. Coursey, District 1, including Atlantic City (part), Egg Harbor Township (part), and Pleasantville (D, 2022, Atlantic City), Chair Maureen Kern, District 2, including Atlantic City (part), Egg Harbor Township (part), Linwood, Longport, Margate City, Northfield, Somers Point and Ventnor City (R, 2024, Somers Point), Andrew Parker III, District 3, including Egg Harbor Township (part) and Hamilton Township (part) (R, Egg Harbor Township, 2023), Richard R. Dase, District 4, including Absecon, Brigantine, Galloway Township and Port Republic (R, 2022, Galloway Township), James A. Bertino, District 5, including Buena, Buena Vista Township, Corbin City, Egg Harbor City, Estell Manor, Folsom, Hamilton Township (part), Hammonton, Mullica Township and Weymouth Township (R, 2018, Hammonton), Caren L. Fitzpatrick, At-Large (D, 2023, Linwood), Frank X. Balles, At-Large (R, Pleasantville, 2024) Amy L. Gatto, Freeholder (R, 2022, Hamilton Township) and Vice Chair John W. Risley, At-Large (R, 2023, Egg Harbor Township)

Atlantic County's constitutional officers are: 
County Clerk Joesph J. Giralo (R, 2026, Hammonton), 
Sheriff Eric Scheffler (D, 2024, Northfield) and 
Surrogate James Curcio (R, 2025, Hammonton).

Politics
As of March 2011, there were a total of 6,619 registered voters in Somers Point City, of which 1,624 (24.5% vs. 30.5% countywide) were registered as Democrats, 1,979 (29.9% vs. 25.2%) were registered as Republicans and 3,009 (45.5% vs. 44.3%) were registered as Unaffiliated. There were 7 voters registered as Libertarians or Greens. Among the city's 2010 Census population, 61.3% (vs. 58.8% in Atlantic County) were registered to vote, including 77.9% of those ages 18 and over (vs. 76.6% countywide).

In the 2012 presidential election, Democrat Barack Obama received 2,506 votes (53.5% vs. 57.9% countywide), ahead of Republican Mitt Romney with 2,077 votes (44.4% vs. 41.1%) and other candidates with 53 votes (1.1% vs. 0.9%), among the 4,681 ballots cast by the city's 7,075 registered voters, for a turnout of 66.2% (vs. 65.8% in Atlantic County). In the 2008 presidential election, Democrat Barack Obama received 2,597 votes (51.5% vs. 56.5% countywide), ahead of Republican John McCain with 2,309 votes (45.8% vs. 41.6%) and other candidates with 71 votes (1.4% vs. 1.1%), among the 5,042 ballots cast by the city's 7,120 registered voters, for a turnout of 70.8% (vs. 68.1% in Atlantic County). In the 2004 presidential election, Republican George W. Bush received 2,529 votes (51.2% vs. 46.2% countywide), ahead of Democrat John Kerry with 2,313 votes (46.9% vs. 52.0%) and other candidates with 43 votes (0.9% vs. 0.8%), among the 4,936 ballots cast by the city's 6,642 registered voters, for a turnout of 74.3% (vs. 69.8% in the whole county).

In the 2013 gubernatorial election, Republican Chris Christie received 1,963 votes (64.3% vs. 60.0% countywide), ahead of Democrat Barbara Buono with 938 votes (30.7% vs. 34.9%) and other candidates with 49 votes (1.6% vs. 1.3%), among the 3,052 ballots cast by the city's 7,272 registered voters, yielding a 42.0% turnout (vs. 41.5% in the county). In the 2009 gubernatorial election, Republican Chris Christie received 1,677 votes (51.3% vs. 47.7% countywide), ahead of Democrat Jon Corzine with 1,282 votes (39.2% vs. 44.5%), Independent Chris Daggett with 224 votes (6.8% vs. 4.8%) and other candidates with 42 votes (1.3% vs. 1.2%), among the 3,271 ballots cast by the city's 6,794 registered voters, yielding a 48.1% turnout (vs. 44.9% in the county).

Somers Point native Maureen Kern currently serves as a member of the Atlantic County Board of Chosen Freeholders.

Historic district

The Bay Front Historic District is a  historic district encompassing an area roughly bounded by Decatur Avenue, Egg Harbor Bay, George Avenue, and Shore Road in the community. It was added to the National Register of Historic Places on March 22, 1989 for its significance in architecture, entertainment/recreation, and social history. The district includes 189 contributing buildings.

Education
Students in pre-kindergarten through eighth grade are served by the Somers Point Public Schools. As of the 2018–19 school year, the district, comprised of three schools, had an enrollment of 894 students and 95.5 classroom teachers (on an FTE basis), for a student–teacher ratio of 9.4:1. Schools in the district (with 2018–19 enrollment data from the National Center for Education Statistics) are 
New York Avenue School with 70 students in pre-kindergarten, 
Dawes Avenue School with 387 students in grades Kindergarten through 3rd grade and 
Jordan Road Middle School with 425 students in 4th through 8th grade.

Students in public school for ninth through twelfth grades attend Mainland Regional High School, which also serves students from Linwood and Northfield. The high school is located in Linwood. For the 1997–1998 school year, Mainland Regional High School was recognized by the United States Department of Education as a National Blue Ribbon School. As of the 2018–2019 school year, the high school had an enrollment of 1,226 students and 112.0 classroom teachers (on an FTE basis), for a student–teacher ratio of 10.9:1.

City public school students are also eligible to attend the Atlantic County Institute of Technology in the Mays Landing section of Hamilton Township or the Charter-Tech High School for the Performing Arts, located in Somers Point.

St. Joseph Regional School is an elementary school serving students in kindergarten through eighth grade, operated under the jurisdiction of the Roman Catholic Diocese of Camden.

Transportation

Roads and highways

The Garden State Parkway passes through the city, connecting Egg Harbor Township on either side of the city. Interchange 30 for the Parkway is located in the city, signed for Somers Point and Downtown Ocean City.

On the city's southern border, bridges connect to Cape May County via the Garden State Parkway to Upper Township, into Ocean City via Route 52 and over the Beesley's Point Bridge, which has been demolished. As part of a $400 million project completed by the New Jersey Department of Transportation in 2012, a new causeway for Route 52 was completed over Great Egg Harbor Bay, replacing the Howard S. Stainton Memorial Causeway that had been completed in 1933. the Beesley's Point Bridge was demolished in 2013 as part of a project adding a new bridge for traffic on the Parkway.

Public transportation
NJ Transit offers bus transportation in the city between Ocean City and Atlantic City on the 507 and 509 routes.

Popular culture
The 1983 movie Eddie and the Cruisers was largely filmed in Somers Point, using the defunct Tony Mart's nightclub as a setting.

Notable people

People who were born in, residents of, or otherwise closely associated with Somers Point include:

 Joe Bastardi (born 1955), meteorologist
 Matt Broomall (born 1994), soccer player who plays as a goalkeeper for the Richmond Kickers in USL League One
 Joshua Cohen (born 1980), novelist and story writer, known for his works Witz and Book of Numbers
 Doug Colman (born 1973), former NFL linebacker
 Peter Erskine (born 1954), jazz drummer
 John H. Hamilton Jr. (1919–1986), member of the Pennsylvania House of Representatives
 Joe Maloy (born 1985), triathlete who was chosen to represent the United States in triathlon at the Rio 2016 Summer Olympics
 Osun Osunniyi (born 1998), college basketball player for the St. Bonaventure Bonnies of the Atlantic 10 Conference
 Jennifer Pershing (born 1980), Playboy Playmate of the Month, March 2009
 Cody Stashak (born 1994), professional baseball pitcher for the Minnesota Twins
 John Stone (born 1979), wide receiver who played in the NFL for the Oakland Raiders
 Gregory L. Verdine (born 1959), chemical biologist, university professor, entrepreneur, venture capitalist and business executive

See also
 Richard Somers, a U.S. Navy hero in the First Barbary War.
 Capt. John Jeffries Burial Marker, a marble gravestone that stands 12-feet high in the cemetery of the Palestine Bible Church.

References

External links

 Somers Point webpage
 300 Years at the Point – The History of Somers Point, New Jersey
 Somers Point Public Schools
 
 School Data for the Somers Point Public Schools, National Center for Education Statistics
 The Current of Somers Point

 
1886 establishments in New Jersey
Cities in Atlantic County, New Jersey
City form of New Jersey government
Populated places established in 1693